Benjamin L. "Ben" Wagner (born August 7, 1980) is an American sportscaster. Since March 2018, he has worked as the play-by-play radio announcer for the Toronto Blue Jays of Major League Baseball (MLB).

Early life
Wagner was born in New Paris, Indiana. As a child, he was a fan of the Chicago Cubs. He was hired for his first on-air role in November 1997, with WAWC-FM in Syracuse, Indiana. Wagner attended Indiana State University, where he worked for WISU-FM calling both men's and women's college baseball games, and graduated in December 2003 with a bachelor's degree in radio-TV/film. While attending the university, he met his wife, Megan.

Career
In 2004, Wagner began working as the play-by-play announcer and director of media and public relations for the Class-A Lakewood BlueClaws. In the offseason, he worked in the radio booth for the University of Maryland Eastern Shore, calling the Hawks basketball games. On March 19, 2007, Wagner was hired as the play-by-play radio announcer for the Triple-A Buffalo Bisons. He remained in that role with the Bisons until March 27, 2018, when it was announced that he would replace the retiring Jerry Howarth as the lead radio play-by-play announcer for the Bisons' parent club, the Toronto Blue Jays.

References

External links

1980 births
Living people
American radio sports announcers
College baseball announcers in the United States
College basketball announcers in the United States
Indiana State University alumni
Major League Baseball broadcasters
People from Elkhart County, Indiana
Sportspeople from Indiana
Toronto Blue Jays announcers